Bridges is a collaborative album by Canadian rapper Moka Only and American hip hop producer Ayatollah. It was released by Nature Sounds on April 10, 2012.

Track listing

References

External links

2012 albums
Collaborative albums
Albums produced by Ayatollah
Moka Only albums
Nature Sounds albums